Darold Williamson (born February 19, 1983) is an American track athlete.

He ran the anchor leg on the gold medal winning 4x400 meter relay team at the 2004 Summer Olympics in Athens.  He also won World Championship gold medals on two subsequent relay teams.   He is 2005 graduate of Baylor University in Waco, Texas, where he won the Big 12 Conference championship in the 400 meter run three years in a row (2001–2003).  Each of the aforementioned relay teams also included Baylor teammate Jeremy Wariner.  He set a personal best of 44.27 seconds in the 400 meter run in the semifinals of the NCAA Outdoor Championships in 2005. He is a 2001 graduate of Business Careers High School in San Antonio, Texas.  Williamson was in the foster care program of the State of Texas and is a Preparation for Adult Living(PAL) alumnus.

References

External links
 Baylor profile 
 USATF profile 
 
 
 
 United States Olympic Committee profile

1983 births
Living people
Track and field athletes from San Antonio
African-American male track and field athletes
American male sprinters
Athletes (track and field) at the 2004 Summer Olympics
Olympic gold medalists for the United States in track and field
Baylor Bears men's track and field athletes
World Athletics Championships medalists
Medalists at the 2004 Summer Olympics
World Athletics Championships winners
21st-century African-American sportspeople
20th-century African-American people